Theropsodon is an extinct genus of traversodontid cynodonts from the Middle Triassic of Tanzania. Fossils have been found from the Manda Formation. A single holotype skull of the type species T. njaliliris was named by German paleontologist Friedrich von Huene in 1950.

References

Traversodontids
Prehistoric cynodont genera
Middle Triassic synapsids of Africa
Fossil taxa described in 1950
Taxa named by Friedrich von Huene